Jud is a ghost town in extreme western Haskell County, Texas, United States.

History
Jud is a farming community.  Each summer, a music festival named JUD FEST takes place with performances by local and regional Texas country artists and a meat cookoff.

See also
Rath City, Texas, another ghost town on the Double Mountain Fork of the Brazos
Double Mountains (Texas)
Brazos River
Double Mountain Fork Brazos River
Rochester, Texas

References

External links
Jud Fest website

Ghost towns in North Texas
Geography of Haskell County, Texas